State Road 985 (SR 985), locally known as West 107th Avenue, FIU Avenue, and Avenue of the Americas, is a  long north–south street in western Miami-Dade County, Florida, serving the communities of Kendall, University Park, Sweetwater, Fontainebleau, and Doral.

Route description

SR 985 begins at an intersection with SR 990 next to the Killian Parkway interchange of the Don Shula Expressway (SR 874) near the Kendall Campus of Miami-Dade College.  It ends at an interchange with the Dolphin Expressway (SR 836) just south of Miami International Mall in Doral. For the entire length of SR 985, Florida's Turnpike (SR 821) runs parallel to it, lying one mile (1.6 km) to the west, with access to it via the Don Shula Expressway, Kendall Drive (SR 94), Bird Road (SR 976), Tamiami Trail (US 41), and the Dolphin Expressway.

It passes through residential neighborhoods with apartment complexes, strip malls, and Miami-Dade County Parks (Tamiami Park at Coral Way, Kendall Indian Hammocks Park between SR 94 and SR 986).  It is also a primary access route for two major regional malls on its northern end.

History
Constructed in the 1940s as an access road for the original Tamiami Airport (now the site of Florida International University), SR 985 has become an important commercial highway and an alternative for the increasingly clogged Turnpike for commuters.

Major intersections

References

External links

985
985